County routes in Herkimer County, New York, are typically signed only on street blade signs. Some routes are signed with the Manual on Uniform Traffic Control Devices-standard yellow-on-blue pentagon route marker; however, this is uncommon.

Routes 1–100

Routes 101–200

Routes 201 and up

See also

County routes in New York
List of former state routes in New York (301–400)

References